Pins-Justaret is a commune in the Haute-Garonne department in southwestern France. Pins-Justaret station has rail connections to Toulouse, Foix and Latour-de-Carol.

Population
The inhabitants of the commune are known as Pins-Justarétois or Pins-Justarétoises in French.

Twin towns
Pins-Justaret is twinned with:

  Cordignano, Italy, since 2004

See also
Communes of the Haute-Garonne department

References

Communes of Haute-Garonne